John Wesley Roper (May 31, 1898 – September 8, 1963) was a Vice Admiral in the United States Navy. He was the son of the 7th United States Secretary of Commerce, Daniel C. Roper.

Career
Roper was a graduate of the United States Naval Academy, Class of 1918.

During that time, he led the Wisconsin in the Battle of Okinawa. For his service during the battle, he was awarded the Legion of Merit. Previously, he had been given a Letter of Commendation for his services in the South Pacific Area, during which time he helped plan the Guadalcanal and Solomon Islands Campaigns.

John Wesley Roper died on September 8, 1963, and was buried together with his wife Hazel N. Roper (1898–1978) at Fort Rosecrans National Cemetery in San Diego.

References

1898 births
1963 deaths
People from North Carolina
United States Navy admirals
United States Naval Academy alumni
United States Navy personnel of World War I
United States Navy personnel of World War II
Recipients of the Legion of Merit
Burials at Fort Rosecrans National Cemetery